Mary, Countess of Falmouth and Dorset (1645 – 1679) was a British courtier and mistress of King Charles II.

The King rewarded her with grants of land, including Somerset House, in the Strand, and a state pension.

She was one of the Windsor Beauties painted by Sir Peter Lely.   Her portrait by Lely was erroneously named "Elizabeth, Countess of Falmouth" and also as "Countess of Ossory" in some portrait prints and books in the 18th and 19th centuries, many of which were later reprinted, compounding the error.

Family
Her parents were Colonel Henry Bagot and his wife Dorothea Arden, of Pipe Hall, Warwickshire.

She married firstly Charles Berkeley, 1st Earl of Falmouth in 1663. He died at the Battle of Lowestoft in 1665. 
She married secondly Charles Sackville, 6th Earl of Dorset in June 1674 (his first marriage).

Mary died on 12 September 1679.

References

External links

"Elizabeth Bagot, Countess of Falmouth & Dorset". (1832) NYPL
"Mary Bagot, Countess of Falmouth and Dorset" (1645–79), c.1664-5, Sir Peter Lely

English countesses
1645 births
1679 deaths
Women of the Stuart period
17th-century English landowners
17th-century women landowners